The 1973 German Open was a combined men's and women's tennis tournament played on outdoor clay courts. It was the 66th edition of the event and was part of the 1973 Commercial Union Assurance Grand Prix circuit. It took place at the Am Rothenbaum in Hamburg, West Germany, from 11 June until 17 June 1973. Eddie Dibbs and Helga Masthoff won the singles titles.

Finals

Men's singles
 Eddie Dibbs defeated  Karl Meiler 6–1, 3–6, 7–6, 6–3

Women's singles
 Helga Masthoff defeated  Pat Pretorius 6–4, 6–1

Men's doubles
 Jürgen Fassbender /  Hans-Jürgen Pohmann defeated  Manuel Orantes /  Ion Țiriac 7–6, 7–6, 7–6

Women's doubles
 Helga Masthoff /  Heide Orth defeated  Kristien Kemmer /  Laura Rossouw 6–1, 6–2

References

External links
  
   
 ATP tournament profile

German Open
Hamburg European Open
1973 in West German sport